Robert Folz (12 March 1910 – 5 March 1996) was a French medievalist and specialist on the Carolingian era.

Born in Metz, Folz spent his academic career at the University of Burgundy in Dijon. Professor of history from 1947, he headed the history department as dean and professor emeritus from 1968, and the faculty of arts from 1978. From 1956 he was a member of the Academy of Science, Arts, and Belles-lettres of Dijon.

His papers are held, as the Fonds Robert Folz, by the University of Burgundy.

Select bibliography
  Le souvenir et la légende de Charlemagne dans l'Empire germanique médiéval. (1950)
 The concept of empire in Western Europe from the fifth to the fourteenth century. (1953, translation published 1969)
 The coronation of Charlemagne. 25 December 800. (1964, translation published 1974)
  Les saints rois du Moyen Âge en Occident, (VIe-XIIIe siècles). (1984)
  Les saintes reines du Moyen Âge en Occident (VIe-XIIIe siècles). (1992)

References
  Pierre Riché, Dictionnaire des Francs: Les Carolingiens, s.v. "Folz (Robert)". Bartillat, 1997. 

French medievalists
1910 births
1996 deaths
20th-century French historians
French male non-fiction writers
University of Burgundy alumni
20th-century French male writers
Corresponding Fellows of the British Academy